Jean-François Fortin (born 12 January 1947 in Coulonges-sur-l'Autize) is a French businessman who was the chairman of SM Caen, a football club in the French Ligue 1. He was made a Chevalier of the Légion d'honneur in 2002.

References

1947 births
Living people
Chevaliers of the Légion d'honneur
French football chairmen and investors
Stade Malherbe Caen
Sportspeople from Deux-Sèvres